Roughead is an English surname. Notable people with the surname include:

 Gary Roughead (b. 1951), a United States naval officer and Chief of Naval Operations
 Jarryd Roughead (b. 1987), an Australian rules football player
 Jordan Roughead (b. 1990), an Australian rules football player
 William Roughead (1870–1952), a Scottish lawyer and writer

English-language surnames